The 2002 WCHA Men's Ice Hockey Tournament was the 43rd conference playoff in league history and 49th season where a WCHA champion was crowned. The 2002 tournament was played between March 8 and March 16, 2002, at five conference arenas and the Xcel Energy Center in St. Paul, Minnesota, the home of the NHL's Minnesota Wild. By winning the tournament, Denver was awarded the Broadmoor Trophy and received the Western Collegiate Hockey Association's automatic bid to the 2002 NCAA Men's Division I Ice Hockey Tournament.

Format
The first round of the postseason tournament featured a best-of-three games format. All ten conference schools participated in the tournament with teams seeded No. 1 through No. 10 according to their final conference standing, with a tiebreaker system used to seed teams with an identical number of points accumulated. The top five seeded teams each earned home ice and hosted one of the lower seeded teams.

The winners of the first round series advanced to the Xcel Energy Center for the WCHA Final Five, the collective name for the quarterfinal, semifinal, and championship rounds. The Final Five uses a single-elimination format. Teams were re-seeded No. 1 through No. 5 according to the final regular season conference standings, with the top three teams automatically advancing to the semifinals.

Conference standings
Note: GP = Games played; W = Wins; L = Losses; T = Ties; PTS = Points; GF = Goals For; GA = Goals Against

Bracket
Teams are reseeded after the first round

Note: * denotes overtime period(s)

First round

(1) Denver vs. (10) Michigan Tech

(2) St. Cloud State vs. (9) Minnesota-Duluth

(3) Minnesota vs. (8) North Dakota

(4) Minnesota State vs. (7) Alaska-Anchorage

(5) Wisconsin vs. (6) Minnesota State-Mankato

Quarterfinal

(4) Colorado College vs. (5) Wisconsin

Semifinals

(1) Denver vs. (4) Colorado College

(2) St. Cloud State vs. (3) Minnesota

Third Place

(2) St. Cloud State vs. (4) Colorado College

Championship

(1) Denver vs. (3) Minnesota

Tournament awards

All-Tournament Team
F Troy Riddle (Minnesota)
F Chris Paradise (Denver)
F Mark Cullen (Colorado College)
D Jordan Leopold (Minnesota)
D Ryan Caldwell (Denver)
G Wade Dubielewicz* (Denver)
* Most Valuable Player(s)

See also
Western Collegiate Hockey Association men's champions

References

External links
WCHA.com
2001–02 WCHA Standings
2001–02 NCAA Standings

WCHA Men's Ice Hockey Tournament
Wcha Men's Ice Hockey Tournament